Lake Otis National Wildlife Refuge is a  National Wildlife Refuge (NWR) in the U.S. state of North Dakota. The refuge is an Easement refuge that is entirely on privately owned land, but the landowners and U.S. Government work cooperatively to protect the resources. The U.S. Fish and Wildlife Service oversees Lake Otis NWR from offices at Audubon National Wildlife Refuge.

This is a limited-interest national wildlife refuge. The FWS has an easement on private property allowing it to manage wildlife habitat, but the land remains private property. There is no public access except from adjacent public roads. Limited-interest refuges were created in the 1930s and 1940s in response to declining waterfowl populations and the need to get people back to work during the Great Depression. Many landowners sold easements allowing the federal government to regulate water levels and restrict hunting.

References

External links
 Audubon National Wildlife Refuge: About the Complex
 Oh Ranger: Lake Otis National Wildlife Refuge

Protected areas of McLean County, North Dakota
National Wildlife Refuges in North Dakota
Easement refuges in North Dakota